Transportation Corridor Agencies (TCA) are two joint powers authorities formed by the California State Legislature in 1986 to plan, finance, construct, and operate Orange County's toll roads. TCA consists of two local government agencies:

 The San Joaquin Hills Transportation Corridor Agency which oversees the San Joaquin Hills Toll Road (State Route 73).
 The Foothill/Eastern Transportation Corridor Agency which runs both the Foothill Toll Road (State Route 241) and the Eastern Toll Road (State Route 241 and State Route 261).

The toll roads maintained by TCA are financed with tax-exempt bonds on a stand-alone basis -- taxpayers are not responsible for repaying any debt if toll revenues fall short.

Some California lawmakers and toll road advocates favor using similar local agencies to build and maintain future tollways, especially after the controversy of authorizing a private company to run the 91 Express Lanes.  Others oppose them, arguing that new toll roads will just facilitate and perpetuate sprawl.

The Transportation Corridor Agency funded studies which argued that the California gnatcatcher was not a distinct species, in order to argue for delisting of the species under the Endangered Species Act of 1973 and enable extension of the State Route 241.

References

External links
 Transportation Corridor Agencies

Transportation in Orange County, California
Toll road authorities of the United States
Transit agencies in California
Roads in Orange County, California
Southern California freeways